Fuat Sezgin (24 October 1924 – 30 June 2018) was a Turkish orientalist  who specialized in the history of Arabic-Islamic science. He was professor emeritus of the History of Natural Science at Johann Wolfgang Goethe University in Frankfurt, Germany and the founder and honorary director of the Institute of the History of the Arab Islamic Sciences there. He also created museums in Frankfurt and Istanbul with replicas of historical Arabic-Islamic scientific instruments, tools and maps. His best known publication is the 17-volume Geschichte des Arabischen Schrifttums, a standard reference in the field.

Career
Sezgin earned his PhD from Istanbul University under the German Orientalist Hellmut Ritter in 1950. His thesis titled "Buhari’nin Kaynakları" (The Sources of Al-Bukhari) argued that, contrary to the common belief among European orientalists, Al-Bukhari's edition of collected Hadiths was based on written sources dating back to the 7th century as well as oral history. He obtained a position at Istanbul University, but was dismissed in the wake of the 1960 coup. He moved to Germany in 1961 and started working as a visiting professor at the University of Frankfurt. He was appointed professor at the university in 1965. His research in Frankfurt focused on Islam's Golden Age of Science. In 1982, Sezgin established the Institute of the History of the Arab Islamic Sciences. Today the Institute houses the most comprehensive collection of texts on the history of Arabic-Islamic science in the world. In 1983 Sezgin also founded a unique museum within the institute, bringing together more than 800 replicas of historical scientific instruments, tools and maps, mostly belonging to the Golden Age of Islamic science. A very similar museum was opened in 2008 in Istanbul.

In 1968, Sezgin found four previously unknown books of Diophantus' Arithmetica at the shrine of Imam Rezā in the holy Islamic city of Mashhad in northeastern Iran.

Publications
Fuat Sezgin was the author and editor of numerous publications. His 17-volume work Geschichte des Arabischen Schrifttums (1967-2000) is the cornerstone reference on the history of science and technology in the Islamic world. The 5-volume Natural Sciences of Islam documents the items in the Frankfurt museum. He had, since 1984, edited the Journal for the History of Arabic-Islamic Science.

Sezgin had argued that Muslim seafarers had reached the Americas by 1420, citing as evidence the inscription on a map and the fact that the high longitudinal precision of early maps of the Americas would not have been attainable using Western navigational technology.

Awards
Sezgin received several awards, including the King Faisal International Prize of Islamic Studies in 1978 and Order of Merit of the Federal Republic of Germany. He is member of the Turkish Academy of Sciences, the Academy of the Kingdom of Morocco and academies of Arabic Language in Cairo, Damascus and Baghdad.

Recognition
On 24 September 2012, Melih Gökçek, Mayor of Municipality of Metropolitan Ankara, announced that a square in Ankara was named in honor of Fuat Sezgin. A relief of him created by artist Aslan Başpınar at the square was revealed the same day in the presence of Fuat Sezgin and his spouse Ursula by the mayor.

References

External links
 Institut für Geschichte der Arabisch-Islamischen Wissenschaften (in German)
 Museum in Frankfurt
 List of Publications by Fuat Sezgin
 Technology and Science in Islam
 Prof.Dr. Fuat Sezgin Research Foundation for the History of Science in Islam

1924 births
2018 deaths
20th-century Turkish historians
Turkish Arabists
Turkish orientalists
Historians of science
Academic staff of Goethe University Frankfurt
Commanders Crosses of the Order of Merit of the Federal Republic of Germany
Member of the Academy of the Kingdom of Morocco
People from Bitlis
Istanbul University alumni
Turkish expatriates in Germany
Honorary members of the Turkish Academy of Sciences
Turkish people of Kurdish descent